Scotorythra anagraptis is a moth of the family Geometridae. It was first described by Edward Meyrick in 1899. It is endemic to the Hawaiian island of Kauai.

External links

Anag
Endemic moths of Hawaii
Biota of Kauai